The Cutting Edge: Fire and Ice is a 2010 American sports-romantic drama television film, the sequel to The Cutting Edge: Chasing the Dream (2008), and the fourth installment in The Cutting Edge film series. Francia Raisa reprises her role as Alexandra "Alex" Delgado, from the third film. The film was produced for the ABC Family cable channel, which aired on March 14, 2010.

Plot 
Alexandra "Alex" Delgado's figure skating career came to an abrupt halt after her partner (on and off the ice) became injured. As their love affair cooled, a heart-broken Alex stopped competing and turned to teaching. Enter James McKinsey, the smoldering bad boy of speed skating, who has had fiery Alex in his sights as a skating partner ever since he was banned from speed skating. There are not many girls who say no to James, and Alex may well be the first. However, James pushes her buttons, challenging her like no one else and her fighting spirit returns. She agrees to be his partner and they begin a grueling practice regimen fueled (and occasionally derailed) by their own tempestuous relationship which heats up as they get closer to competition. But will their passion destroy Alex's chance to bring home the gold again?

Cast 
 Francia Raisa as Alexandra "Alex" Delgado
 Brendan Fehr as James McKinsey
 Zhenhu Han as Zhen Zheng
 Russell Yuen as Mr. Wan
 Dan Jeannotte as Angus Dwell

References

External links 
 

Figure skating films
ABC Family original films
2010 television films
2010 films
2010 romantic drama films
Films directed by Stephen Herek
Direct-to-video sequel films
Television sequel films
American romantic drama films
Films set in 2010
Films set in Seattle
Metro-Goldwyn-Mayer films
2010s English-language films
2010s American films